Priscilla Mitchell (September 18, 1941 – September 24, 2014) was an American country music singer.

Biography
Priscilla Mitchell began as a rock 'n' roll singer in the 1950s as well as a background singer for NRC Records, and became most popular as a duet performer when she cut a string of duet recordings, in the 1960s, with country singer Roy Drusky. Drusky and Mitchell recorded a series of hits, their best-selling recordings being country music "cheating songs", including their biggest hit together, "Yes, Mr. Peters",
released in 1965, becoming number 1 on the country charts.

Priscilla graduated from Sprayberry High School in Marietta, Georgia in 1959.

Priscilla Mitchell was married to country singer, songwriter, actor, and session guitarist Jerry Reed from 1959 until his death on September 1, 2008; together they had two daughters who are also country singers.

The songs "It Comes and Goes" and "I Want That Boy" she also recorded under the name "Sadina".

Mitchell died on September 24, 2014, following a short illness, six days after her 73rd birthday. She is survived by her daughters, her sister and her two grandchildren.

Discography

Albums

Singles

References

1941 births
2014 deaths
American women country singers
American country singer-songwriters
National Recording Corporation artists
Mercury Records artists
21st-century American women